Ureaplasma is a genus of bacteria belonging to the family Mycoplasmataceae.  As the name imples, Ureaplasma is urease positive.

Phylogeny
The currently accepted taxonomy is based on the List of Prokaryotic names with Standing in Nomenclature (LPSN) and National Center for Biotechnology Information (NCBI)

See also 
 List of bacterial orders
 List of bacteria genera

References

External links
Ureaplasma Infection: eMedicine Infectious Diseases

 
Bacteria genera